Wray railway station was a short-lived station near the village of Wray in the City of Lancaster district of Lancashire, England. The station was a single-building cottage and was administered by John Bee until 1891.

The line remained in use until closure to passengers in 1966 between Wennington and Morecambe Promenade. Freight services finished the following year in 1967 and the track was subsequently dismantled. The old formation has since been returned to agricultural land. The course of the route can still be followed from nearby roads and on satellite images, with several overbridges still standing.

References

Disused railway stations in Lancaster
Former Midland Railway stations
Railway stations in Great Britain opened in 1849